Montezuma's Revenge is the fifth studio album by the Oakland hip hop group Souls of Mischief.  It was released on December 1, 2009 by Clear Label Records.  This album is notable for the collaboration with prominent producer Prince Paul who is also depicted with the group on the front cover.

Track listing

References

2009 albums
Souls of Mischief albums
Albums produced by Prince Paul (producer)